Saint James School is an independent, nonsectarian, college preparatory school located in Montgomery, Alabama, United States. Established in 1955, Saint James School, Montgomery's oldest private school, serves about 900 students in pre-kindergarten through grade 12.

History

Saint James School began in 1955 as an independent elementary school, housed in Saint James United Methodist Church. In 1970, the school's enrollment doubled after the court ordered the desegregation of public schools. That same year, the school purchased property and opened a second campus, providing classrooms and facilities to meet the needs of a growing student body population including junior and high school students. 

In 1972, a federal judge prohibited the city of Montgomery from allowing the school and three other private schools from using city recreational facilities, due to the fact that the schools in question either refused to admit black students by policy or claimed to accept black students and teachers but remained all white.

By 1974, Saint James School had 951 students enrolled in kindergarten through twelfth grade and graduated its first high school class. The two campuses united two years later.

In 1976 the Saint James School, along with the Montgomery Academy, was named in a suit filed against United States Secretary of the Treasury William Simon and Commissioner of Internal Revenue Donald C. Alexander by five black women from Montgomery charging that the two men had encouraged the development of segregated schools by allowing them tax-deductible status.

In 1982, the school leased a new facility on a 30-acre campus, in the city's booming eastern section, which would serve as key to the school's future development and expansion. In 1984, Winton Blount, benefactor of the Alabama Shakespeare Festival, endowed Saint James School the funds to build a state-of-the art Fine Arts Building. Blount's commitment changed the future of Saint James by challenging school leaders to adopt a dedication to excellence in the fine arts.

In 1991, a modern new high school building was constructed on the Vaughn Road campus, and after a devastating tornado destroyed the school's elementary site on Vaughn Road (in the early morning hours on March 6, 1996), more construction was soon underway. Within 18 months, a new campus greeted returning students. Designed and organized like a small college campus, the modern facilities included a new middle school, a new high school building, a large gym, a performing arts building, as well as brand new elementary buildings. Both Saint James campuses were consolidated at the Vaughn Road site in 2002-03, enabling the co-location of elementary, middle, and high schools all at one site. 

Saint James School admits students of any race, religion, color, gender, creed, and national and ethnic origin. The school serves students from approximately 15 different countries each year. In addition, the school offers competitive academic, athletic, and award-winning visual/performing programs that help develop well-rounded students and, according to its mission, prepare them for lives of responsibility, service, and achievement.

Athletics 
Saint James School is a member of the Alabama High School Athletic Association. The school's athletic teams include baseball, fast pitch softball, basketball, cheerleading, dance, cross country, football, golf, soccer, tennis, track and field, volleyball, equestrian, and wrestling.

The Trojans baseball team won state championships in Division 2A in 1991 and in Division 4A in 2006.

The Lady Trojans softball team won Division 4A state championships in 1996 (1A-4A), 2001, 2005, 2006 and 2008.

The Lady Trojans volleyball team won Division 4A state championships in 2001, 2003, and 2017.

The Lady Trojans indoor track team won a state title in 2002 in 1A-4A.

The Lady Trojans tennis team won a state title in 2003 under division 4A and another title in 2019 under division 1A-3A.  

Varsity wrestling won a state title in 2013.

Varsity golf won a state title in 2015.

Varsity Girls Indoor Track and Field won the 4A state title in 2019 and the 1A-3A state title in 2020. 

Varsity Girls Outdoor Track and Field won the 1A-3A state title in 2019. 

Varsity Football won the 3A state title in 2022.

References

External links 
Saint James School website
Saint James Trojan athletics

Schools in Montgomery, Alabama
Private middle schools in Alabama
Private elementary schools in Alabama
Private high schools in Alabama
High schools in Montgomery, Alabama
Educational institutions established in 1955
Preparatory schools in Alabama
Segregation academies in Alabama
1955 establishments in Alabama